Albina is a historical American city that was consolidated into Portland, Oregon in 1891.

The land the City of Albina would later be built on was claimed by J.L. Losing and Joseph Delay under the U.S. Donation Land Claim Act of 1850. The land was then sold to William Winter Page. In 1872, Page sold the land to George Henry Williams and Edwin Russell, who laid out the original town site. Williams and Russell named the City of Albina for Page's wife and daughter, both of whom were named Albina.

In 1874, Russell went bankrupt and left Oregon for San Francisco. James Montgomery and William Reid then acquired the property and started residential development.

As of 1880, the population of Albina was 143 people. The city was incorporated in 1887 and by 1888, Albina's population was 3,000. The area was home to the Oregon Railroad and Navigation Company's Albina railroad yards, which employed many of the city's residents.

The original dimensions of Albina were modest: from Halsey Street north to Morris Street, and from the Willamette River to Margareta Avenue (later Union Avenue, and now Martin Luther King Jr. Boulevard).  In 1889, Albina annexed the land north to Killingsworth Street and east to 24th. In 1891, Albina annexed everything north to Columbia Boulevard and west to the Portsmouth area.  On July 6, 1891, Portland, East Portland, and Albina were consolidated into one city.

See also 
 Albina Library
 Albina Riot of 1967
 Albina Yard
 Albina Youth Opportunity School
 Frederick Torgler Building
 Patton Home
 Rinehart Building

References

External links 

Albina Riot, 1967
History of the Albina Plan Area
Albina Community Plan
Boise and Eliot: Local historian's quest protects black history
Bleeding Albina: A History of Community Disinvestment, 1940-2000

Geography of Portland, Oregon
Former cities in Oregon
1872 establishments in Oregon
Populated places established in 1872
1891 disestablishments in Oregon
African-American history in Portland, Oregon
North Portland, Oregon
Northeast Portland, Oregon